Kwame Boateng (born 28 November 1992) is a Ghanaian professional football striker. He currently plays for Karela United.

Club career
Boateng was part of Asante Kotoko coached by a Serbian manager Bogdan Korak. During the summer of 2011, the club went on a tour to Serbia to play a series of friendlies and to try to impress clubs and scouts in Europe. Boateng and Owusu-Ansah Kontor stayed in Serbia and joined Metalac Gornji Milanovac of the Serbian SuperLiga. He made his league debut on September 10, 2011, in a round 4 match against Javor Ivanjica.

International career
On 25 May 2015, Boateng made his debut for the Ghana national football team in a friendly game against Madagascar.

References

1992 births
Living people
Footballers from Accra
Ghanaian footballers
Ghana international footballers
Ghanaian expatriate footballers
Association football forwards
Asante Kotoko S.C. players
FK Metalac Gornji Milanovac players
Serbian SuperLiga players
Expatriate footballers in Serbia
Karela United FC players